Platyhomonopsis is a genus of moths belonging to the family Tortricidae. It contains only one species, Platyhomonopsis dentata, which is found in China (Guizhou).

The wingspan is 17–18.5 mm. The ground colour of the forewings is dark brown, with small blue metallic spots. The basal part of the costa is dark grey. The hindwings are dark grey.

Etymology
The genus name is derived from the Greek prefix platy (meaning broad) and the generic name Homonopsis and refers to the similarity with Homonopsis. The species name refers to the dent in the ventral margin of the valva and is derived from Latin dentatus (meaning dentate).

See also
List of Tortricidae genera

References

External links
tortricidae.com

Archipini
Monotypic moth genera
Moths of Asia
Moths described in 2005
Tortricidae genera